Vijay K. Bhargava (विजय भार्गव; born September 22, 1948) is a researcher and Professor in the Department of Electrical and Computer Engineering at the University of British Columbia (UBC). He served the department as its Head for 5 years (July 2003-June 2008). Before moving to UBC, Bhargava was a Professor in the Department of Electrical and Computer Engineering at University of Victoria.

Bhargava received his B.Sc. from Queen's University, Kingston, Ontario in 1970. He received his M.Sc. and Ph.D. from the same university in 1972 and 1974 respectively. He has been appointed in regular and visiting positions at the University of Victoria (UVic), Indian Institute of Science, University of Waterloo, Concordia University, Ecole Polytechnique de Montreal, UNIDO, NTT Wireless Comm. Labs, Tokyo Institute of Technology, University of Indonesia, the Hong Kong University of Science and Technology, the University of Hong Kong and City University of Hong Kong.

Bhargava was the founder and president of Binary Communications Inc. from 1983 to 2000. He is a co-author/co-editor of several books including Green Radio Communication Networks (2012), Digital Communications by Satellite: Modulation, Multiple Access, and Coding (1981), Cooperative Cellular Wireless Communications (2011), Reed Solomon Codes and their Applications (1994), Communications, Information and Network Security (2003) and Cognitive Wireless Communication Networks (2007).

Bhargava is Fellow of the IEEE and is active in the same. He has served as the President of the Information Theory Society, VP for Regional Activities Board, Director of Region 7, Montreal Section Chair and Victoria Section Chair. He is a past member of the Board of Governors of the IEEE Communications Society (ComSoc) and the IEEE Information Theory Society. He was nominated by the IEEE BoD as a candidate for the office of President-Elect in 1996 and 2002. He was the editor-in-chief of the IEEE Transactions on Wireless Communications from 2007–2009. He also served the IEEE Communications Society as the Director of Journals. Vijay Bhargava is the current President of the IEEE Communications Society.

In September 2008, the "International Workshop on Advances in Communications (VijayFest 2008)" was organized in honour of the distinguished career of Bhargava on the occasion of his sixtieth birthday. In 2009, Vahid Tarokh, professor at Harvard University, dedicated his edited book New Directions in Wireless Communications Research to Bhargava "in deep respect and admiration for his over 30 years of extraordinary leadership and innovation in the field of communications research".

Bhargava has been actively involved in a number of conferences, reviving the IEEE Canadian Conference on Electrical and Computer Engineering, and founding the IEEE Pacific Rim Conference held at the University of Victoria during odd numbered years.

See also
 List of University of Waterloo people

References

Notes

External links
Homepage of Vijay Bhargava at UBC
VijayFest 2008 - A workshop in honour of the distinguished career of Professor Vijay K. Bhargava on the occasion of his sixtieth birthday
Vijay Bhargava recognized by the Royal Society of Canada
Vijay's Profile at ISIHighlyCited.com

Academic staff of the University of British Columbia Faculty of Applied Science
Fellows of the Royal Society of Canada
Fellows of the Engineering Institute of Canada
Fellow Members of the IEEE
Living people
1948 births
Canadian electrical engineers
Presidents of the IEEE Communications Society